"...If One of Them is Dead" is the third overall, episode of Pretty Little Liars: The Perfectionists. It aired on Freeform on April 3, 2019. In this episode, the characters begin dealing with the repercussions of the investigations of Nolan's murder and begin looking into it themselves. The episode was written by Charlie Craig, directed by Geary McLeod and was watched live by 0.29 million viewers.

Plot
Alison along with Caitlin, Dylan, and Ava begin putting the details of their alibi together so that if questioned the alibi would stick. While trying to find out information about Nolan's murder Mona is locked out of Beacon Guard's system. During class, Mason takes Nolan's former seat which leads to an altercation between Mason and Ava. Ava runs out of class and Caitlin attempts to catch up to her. Caitlin is interrupted by Dana who questions her about the same picture that Nolan was blackmailing her with. Claire gives Caitlin a present she found in Nolan's room that she assumes was for her upcoming birthday. Claire also agrees to keep the photos that Nolan was blackmailing Caitlin with under wraps.

Mona learns that the suspicious activity on her account came from one single source and she assumes that someone is trying to frame her. Caitlin visits Ava and gives her the present that she received from Claire. While practicing his cello Dylan's tablet is hacked and a photo which could possibly be used to blackmail him is the only thing showing up. Dana shows up in Dylan's room and asks him if his secrets are safe with Caitlin and Ava. Ava admits to Caitlin and Dylan that the night Nolan died she followed him out to a mysterious cabin in the woods. The three of them visit the cabin and begin searching it. They realize that they were followed to the cabin and try to hide but Alison walks in before they can. Ava tells Alison that the night Nolan died she followed him out there and that he met a blond woman who looked similar to Alison.

While Ava, Caitlin, and Dylan are driving back they find a dead rat in a box in the car with a note. Alison doubles back to the cabin and removes a flower from a shelf she thinks could be a clue. When scrolling through Instagram later, Alison finds a photo of Taylor's grave which includes the same flower she found in the cabin. Alison visits Mona and tells Mona her theory of Taylor being alive. When Caitlin is walking home she crosses paths with Mason who drops a gum wrapper similar to the one she, Ava and Dylan found in the woods leading her to believe that he was the one eavesdropping on them in the woods the night of Nolan's murder.

Production

Development
Norman Buckley served as the episodes tech scout. The episode was directed by Geary McLeod and was written by executive producer Charlie Craig. Buckley and Craig both previously worked on parent series Pretty Little Liars with Craig serving as co-showrunner on the series. The read through for the episode took place on October 24, 2018. Filming for the episode began the following day on October 25. The episode is named after the series opening theme "Secret", written by Catherine Pierce and performed by Denmark + Winter in which the final lyrics are "If One of Them is Dead". This marks the second time in the Pretty Little Liars franchise that an episode was named after lyrics in the song following "Taking This One to the Grave", from the fifth season of Pretty Little Liars.

Casting
Noah Grey-Cabey and Klea Scott both reprised their roles as Mason and Dana Booker, respectively, after both being cast in recurring roles for the series.

Reception

Critical response
Amanda Lundgren with Cosmopolitan stated that "Alison DiLaurentis Is Back on Her Bullsh*t" after viewing the episode. Meanwhile, Rachel Foertsch with TV Fanatic said "Either the series needs to up its chill factor or up the characters' reactions to what's happening around them" and gave the episode an editorial rating of 3 out of 5 stars.

Viewing figures
The episode was watched live by 0.29 million viewers. This is up from the previous episode which only received 0.24 million, but still down from the series premiere which was watched live by 0.49 million.

Notes

References

External links
 

2019 American television episodes